St Werburgh's Church, dedicated to Saint Werburgh, may refer to a number of churches in England, and one in Ireland.

Churches

England
St Werburgh's Church, Birkenhead, Merseyside
St Werburgh's Church, Bristol (deconsecrated, now a climbing centre)
St Werburgh's Church, Chester
St Werburgh's Church, Derby
St Werburgh's Church, Kingsley, Staffordshire
St Werburgh's Church, Spondon, Derby
St Werburgh's Church, Warbstow, Cornwall
St Werburgh's Church, Warburton, Greater Manchester
St Werburgh’s Church, Wembury, Devon
St Werburgh's Church, Chorlton-cum-Hardy, Chorlton-cum-Hardy, Manchester

Ireland
St. Werburgh's Church, Dublin

See also
St Werburghs, an area of Bristol, England
Werburgh Street, a street in Dublin, Ireland
Werburgh Street Theatre, a former theatre in Dublin, Ireland
Abbey of St Werburgh